Mino may refer to:

Places in Japan
 Mino, Gifu, a city in Gifu Prefecture
 Mino, Kagawa, a former town in Kagawa Prefecture
 Mino, Tokushima, a town in Tokushima Prefecture
 Mino, an alternate spelling of Minoh, a city in Osaka Prefecture
 Mino District, Hyōgo, a former district in Hyōgo Prefecture
 Mino District, Shimane, a former district in Shimane Prefecture
 Mino Province, an old province in the southern part of Gifu Prefecture

Arts and entertainment
 Mino (miniseries), a 1986 Italian-West German miniseries
 Mino, the pieces of a Tetrimino in Tetris
 Mino, a video game by Xio Interactive involved in the lawsuit Tetris Holding, LLC v. Xio Interactive, Inc.

People
 Mino (given name), a list of people with the given name or nickname
 Mino (footballer), Spanish former footballer Bernardino Serrano Mori (born 1963)
 Mino (rapper), stage name of South Korean rapper Song Min-ho (born 1993)
 Monta Mino, Japanese television presenter (born 1944)
 Mino Nenki, fictional character in the novel The Kouga Ninja Scrolls

Other uses
 Mino dialect, a Japanese dialect spoken in southern Gifu Prefecture
 Mino Station, a railway station in Mitoyo, Kagawa Prefecture, Japan
 Minō Toll Road, Minoh, Osaka Prefecture, Japan
 Mino (straw cape), a type of traditional Japanese raincoat
 Mino (bird), a genus of myna starlings
 Dahomey Amazons, or Mino, a military unit of female warriors in the kingdom of Dahomey
 Flip Video Mino, a small camcorder

See also
 Minho (disambiguation), including Miño